The National Research Council of Canada Nanotechnology Research Centre (formerly National Institute for Nanotechnology) is a research institution located on the University of Alberta main campus, in Edmonton, Alberta, Canada.  Its primary purpose is nanoscience research.

The institute was established in 2001 as a partnership between the National Research Council of Canada, the University of Alberta, and the Government of Alberta.  It is administered as an institute of the National Research Council of Canada (NRC), and governed by a Board of Trustees nominated by the partners. Its core funding comes from the Government of Canada and additional funding and research support comes from the university, Government of Alberta, and various federal and provincial funding agencies.

In June 2006, the institute moved into its present  facility, designed to be one of the world's largest buildings for nanotechnological research. There are at most two or three other facilities worldwide matching the new building in scale and capacity.

In 2017, the institute became the Nanotechnology Research Centre, following a recognition of the institute as its own research centre. Although on the premises of the University of Alberta, the research centre is a branch of the National Research Council of Canada.

Research areas
The Nanotechnology Research Centre plans to focus on the following areas of research:

NanoBiology

 Antimicrobials
Drug delivery
Gene delivery
Immunity
Biomaterials
Scaffolds

NanoElectronics

 Electrochem
Microfluidics
Nano & Micro Fabrication
Optical NEMS
Photonics
Quantum

Next-generation Microscopy

 Advanced characterization
 Instrument development
 Integration & optimization
 Microscopy-enabled manufacturing

Achievements
A new approach to nanosensors, revolutionizing the concept, was published in Science magazine in 2018.

The sharpest man-made object, a tungsten needle created by Mohamed Rezeq, was created at NINT in 2006.

See also
Natural scientific research in Canada
Technological and industrial history of Canada
Canadian government scientific research organizations
Canadian university scientific research organizations
Canadian industrial research and development organizations

References

External links
Nanotechnology Research Centre, Government of Canada
University of Alberta Planning and Infrastructure: NINT

2001 establishments in Alberta
Laboratories in Canada
Nanotechnology institutions
National Research Council (Canada)
Research institutes in Canada
Scientific organizations based in Canada
University of Alberta buildings